Mumbles Lighthouse, completed in 1794, is a lighthouse located in Mumbles, near Swansea. The structure, which sits on the outer of two islands off Mumbles Head, is clearly visible from any point along the five mile sweep of Swansea Bay. Along with the nearby lifeboat station, it is the most photographed landmark in the village.

The tower has two tiers and initially two open coal fire lights were displayed. These open coal fire lights were difficult to maintain and were soon replaced by a single oil-powered light within a cast-iron lantern.

In 1860, the oil-powered light was upgraded to a dioptric light and the Mumbles Battery, a  fort that surrounds the tower, was built by the War Department.

In 1905, an occulting mechanism, where the light was made to flash, was fitted. This was partially automated in 1934.

By 1977, the cast-iron lantern had deteriorated beyond repair and was removed. A different lantern was added in 1987.

In 1995, the main light was replaced and an array of solar panels and emergency monitoring equipment were added.

See also

 List of lighthouses in Wales
 Trinity House

References

External links

 
 Chesapeake Bay Lighthouse Project - The Mumbles Lighthouse
 “The Guns of Mumbles Lighthouse Island” by A History of Mumbles
 “Charlie Cottle - The Last Mumbles Lighthouse Keeper” by Carol Powell
 “The Women of Mumbles Head” by Carol Powell. This records the heroism during a storm, of the Ace Sisters, Jessie Ace & Margaret Wright
 Trinity House

Lighthouses in Wales
Lighthouses completed in 1794
Towers completed in 1794
Grade II* listed buildings in Swansea
Grade II* listed lighthouses
1794 establishments in Wales
lighthouse